Manapanthal is 1961 Indian Tamil-language romance film, directed by V. N. Reddy, produced by T. R. Ramanna and written by Thuraiyur K. Moorthy, with music by Viswanathan–Ramamoorthy. The film stars S. S. Rajendran, S. A. Ashokan, B. Saroja Devi and E. V. Saroja, with P. Kannamba, V. Nagayya, Rama Rao, K. A. Thangavelu and M. Saroja in supporting roles. The film was simultaneously made in Telugu as Intiki Deepam Illale; both versions are based on the American film Sabrina (1954).

Plot 
Rajasekaran is an alcoholic, and his younger brother Gunasekaran is a successful medical practitioner. The widowed mother Kannamba showers her love and affection on her two sons and tries to reform Rajasekaran, with little success. Gunasekaran stays in another town with a widowed mother Dharuvamma and her sprightly daughter Malathi, who falls in love with him; he too seems to show some interest in her.

However, on a rail journey to his hometown, Gunasekaran meets Dharmalingam, an elderly man with a daughter Suguna and both fall in love, and hope to marry soon. Meanwhile, Rajasekaran's mother hopes marriage will reform him and fixes his marriage with Suguna, not realising that Gunasekaran is love with her.

The wedding happens, and Gunasekaran, due to an accident, is unable to attend it and does not known that the bride is Suguna. Later, when he meets her, he is shocked. Rajasekaran suspects his wife and brother when he learns that she was his lover earlier. He decides to kill them. Meanwhile, Kannamba dies, leaving behind all the property to her daughter-in-law.

Gunasekaran puts on an act of having become an alcoholic and makes overtures to his sister-in-law Suguna, who slaps him. Seeing this, her husband realises the truth and apologises to her. The family is reunited. While travelling via train, Gunasekaran notices a young woman dressed as a bride lying on the railway track to commit suicide. The train stops in time and Gunasekaran finds that the women is Malathi, who is still in love with him. The two marry.

Cast 
 S. S. Rajendran as Dr. Gunasekaran
 S. A. Ashokan as Rajasekaran
B. Sarojadevi as Suguna
 E. V. Saroja as Malathi
P. Kannamba as Kannamba
V. Nagayya as Dharmalingam
 K. A. Thangavelu as Dr. Navadeenal
 M. Saroja as Navami
 Rama Rao as Ashtami
 K. Malathi as Dharuvamma

Production 
Manapanthal was directed by V. N. Reddy and produced by T. R. Ramanna under R. R. Pictures. Thuraiyur K. Murthi wrote the screenplay. Hiralal and Gopalakrishnan were the dance choreographers. It was simultaneously made in Telugu as Intiki Deepam Illale; both versions were based on the American film  Sabrina (1954).

Soundtrack 
The music was composed by Viswanathan–Ramamoorthy, while the lyrics were written by Kannadasan. The songs were well received, and contributed to the success of the film. Two songs – "Unakkum Matttum Unakkum", sung by P. Susheela, and "Udalukku Uyir Kaaval", sung by P. B. Srinivas – attained popularity.

Release and reception 
Manapanthal was released on 14 January 1961. The film was a commercial success, running for over 100 days in theatres.

References

External links 
 

1960s romance films
1960s Tamil-language films
1961 films
Films scored by Viswanathan–Ramamoorthy
Indian black-and-white films
Indian remakes of American films
Indian romance films